Calabar Carnival is an annual carnival held in Cross River State, Nigeria. The carnival holds every December and was declared by the then governor of Cross River State, Mr. Donald Duke as an activity to mark Christmas celebration yearly. He said his vision for creating the festival was to make Cross-River a home of tourism and hospitality in Nigeria and Africa. The quality of the festival has grown over the years making it Nigeria's biggest carnival and an internationally recognized festival. It used to be a month-long event that began on the 1st of December, until the current governor of the state, Benedict Ayade reduced it to two weeks after he was elected. During the 2017 carnival, Governor Benedict Ayade said in his speech that the carnival is to showcase Africa as the richest continent and a blessed place where the young ones should be proud to belong. The carnival has always been entertaining and colourful as different competitions take place and huge cash prizes are won. Calabar which is also known by the name Canaan City, is a city in south-eastern Nigeria. Calabar is actually the capital city of Cross River State. Calabar sits adjacent to the Calabar and Great Kwa Rivers as well as the creeks of the Cross River.

History 
The Calabar Carnival started in 2004 by Governor Donald Duke of Cross River, as a way to promote tourism and improve the local economy.  According to Osima-Dokubo, "the carnival aimed to include more aspects of local heritage and culture and at the same time strengthen the capacity of the locals to participate in an economically beneficial way."

Programmes 

The programme is drafted each year by the committee in charge of tourism and cultural activities and new initiatives are introduced with different topics chosen to drive the carnival. In December 2009, the Carnival Committee organized "Carnival Cup 2009", a football competition among the five competing carnival bands - Seagull, Passion 4, Masta Blasta, Bayside and Freedom. These bands are distinguished by their colors; The Seagull is the Red band and is known as the most stylish and coordinated band, Passion 4 is the Green band and is known as the most successful band, Masta Blasta is the orange and largest band, Bayside is the Blue band, and Freedom is the Yellow band. The Festival also includes music performance from both local and international artists, the annual Calabar Carnival, Boat regatta, Fashion shows (introduced in 2016), Beauty pageant (Miss Africa introduced in 2016) Christmas Village, traditional dances and the annual Ekpe Festival that brings in thousands of tourists.)

Other activities that make up this carnival include essay writing competitions, which involves both secondary school and tertiary students. These competitions are designed to promote reading culture among the youths of the State and inculcate in them the carnival culture.

Participants 

The event hosts local and international musicians, actors and actresses, politicians and other notable men and women. Some of the entertainers who have attended the carnival include Lucky Dube, Akon, Fat Joe, Young Jeezy, Nelly, Kirk Franklin.

Festivals and themes

2013
The 2013 Calabar Carnival was focused on Nigerian artists.

2015
The theme for the  2015 Calabar carnival was Climate change. According to the Cross River State Governor Ben Ayade, the carnival was host to more than 15 countries. That year, he adopted beauty queens to form a band known as the governor's band.

2017
Migration has a long history in Africa, as it has also been the home of many cultures for many centuries.

2018
The 15th edition of the carnival held in 2018. The then Governor of Cross River State Benedict Ayade introduced the theme "Africanism" to tell the African story from the African perspective. The theme was also meant to show that Africa is free from Western Colonization and no longer under their political and economic control.

2019
The 2019 Calabar Carnival theme "Humanity" was created to challenge mankind that every human being has a right to existence. The theme was also meant to charge mankind not to be a source of pain to another person's life. Apart from dancing and displaying the culture of the African people, the carnival aimed at addressing the world's problems, one of which is inhumanity. As Governor Benedict Ayade flagged the year's theme - Humanity he emphasized the need for all to shun war as it does not depict the true personalities of those who claim to love humanity.

2020
In 2020, the Cross River State House of Assembly called for a suspension of the festival due to the coronavirus pandemic and restrictions on massive gatherings in the country  as well as the mass destruction and looting of goods and infrastructure by hooligans under the auspices of the #EndSARS protest.

2021
in 2021, the Cross River State Government, cancelled the Carnival Calabar Festival due to still Covid19 pandemic.

2022
Following a two-year break, due to the COVID-19 Pandemic, the Cross River State Government says the 2022 Edition of the annual Africa Biggest Street Party, Carnival Calabar, will be organised to change the face of the state’s economy. Briefing journalists in Calabar on the preparation for the event, the Commissioner for Culture and Tourism, Eric Anderson, and the Chairman of the Carnival Commission, Gabe Onah, said the 32 days event will be reloaded and participatory, with skilled and unskilled labour engagement.

Anderson said the gap created from the two years suspension, as a result of COVID-19, will be filled with a mega event, that will change the face of Nigeria’s socio-political and economic landscape.

The Director General of Primary Healthcare Development Agency, Dr Janet Ekpenyong, who is heading the health cluster, assured of preparation, to avoid the breakdown of diseases during the event.  The state government also announced the increase in the competing bands, from five to seven, including Diamond and Kalasvegas Bands, which are to join the Master Blasta, Passion 4, and freedom, among others.

On 28 December 2022, a drunk driver rammed his vehicle into the carnival's crowd, killing 14 people and wounding 24 more. This led to the governor, Ben Ayade discontinuing the Biker's Parade - a part of the carnival event.

The 2022 Carnival Calabar theme was "Agro-Industrialization".

See also 
 Festivals in Nigeria

References

External links 

 Carnival Calabar's Website
 Cross River State Government Homepage
 Cross River State ... People's paradise
Cross River State Festival Website
Cross River Forum..Tourism and Investment website

Cross River State

Music festivals in Nigeria
Carnivals in Nigeria
Recurring events established in 2004
2004 establishments in Nigeria